The Science, Technology and Innovation (STI) sector is guided by two primary institutions, the National Commission on Science and Technology (NCST) and the Scientific Research Council (SRC). Both are under the direction of the Ministry of Science, Energy, and Technology.

History 

Science and technology in Jamaica has a long history. In 1879, the Governor of Jamaica created the Institute of Jamaica "For the Encouragement of Literature, Science and Art in Jamaica". Jamaica was among the earliest developing countries to craft a scientific law to guide the use of science and technology for the exploitation of domestic natural resources. It was one of the first countries in the western hemisphere to gain electricity, build a railway and to use research results to boost sugar cane production. In 1960, the Scientific Research Council (SRC) was established, with a mandate to "collect, collate and review information concerning scientific research schemes or programmes relevant to the development of the resources of Jamaica (and) to establish and maintain a scientific information centre for collection and dissemination of scientific and technical information".

Science and technology policy 
Since the 1990s, the Jamaican government has set an agenda to push the development of science and technology in Jamaica. Acknowledging the pivotal role of ST&I in national development,  the Government of Jamaica formulated a national science and technology policy. The Jamaican Science and Technology Policy (1990) has two missions: 1) to improve science, technology and engineering and 2) to leverage its use to enhance societal needs. The overall goal is to make Jamaica a significant player in the arena of information technology.

In 2009, Jamaica launched Vision 2030, a national development plan that aims to put Jamaica in a position to achieve developed country status by 2030. National Outcome 11 is a "Technology-Enabled Society", to create a more prosperous economy.

Efforts to develop its Science and Technology educative system, through institutions such as The University of Technology, has been successful but it has been difficult to translate the results into domestic technologies, products and services because of national budgetary constraints. Expenditure on research and development (R&D) amounted to just 0.06 per cent of GDP in 2002. For comparison, the world average was 2.044 per cent. In 2018, Jamaica spent just 0.7 per cent. For comparison, the world average was over 2.2 per cent. However, recent improvements in the country's fiscal position, has enabled the government to introduce various policies to boost research expenditure and to encourage innovation. In 2019, the Jamaican government indicated that it would provide funding for research and development as of financial year 2019–20, and that effective from September 2020, it will take research and development spending into account in the calculation of the country's gross domestic product. Concerning counting R&D as a share of GDP, Finance Minister Dr Nigel Clarke said the move will stimulate greater investment in the sector, which will, in turn, drive innovation.

According to the International Property Rights Index, Jamaica has one of the stronger intellectual property (IP) protection regimes in Latin America and the Caribbean (ranked 4th in 2020). In January 2020, the Jamaican Parliament passed the Patents and Designs Act (the "New Act"). The New Act will enable local industrial designers to secure international protection for their work in multiple jurisdictions by means of a single application, filed in one language, with one set of fees. A more efficient and streamlined patents application process will hope to foster innovation and development. The Hon. Pearnel Charles Jr, who piloted the legislation, stated "It will allow us to raise our standards and to have international compliance in several aspects and safeguard the inventors in our country. Through this Bill, [inventors] will receive much more protection, and hence there will be greater promotion of creativity and efforts to find solutions to our challenges".

Jamaica has successfully operated a SLOWPOKE-2 nuclear reactor of 20 kW capacity since the early 1980s. It's the Caribbean's only nuclear reactor. In late 2020, Jamaica launched its Hazardous Substances Regulatory Authority (HSRA), becoming the first country in the English-speaking Caribbean to establish an independent regulatory body to ensure safety and security in the operation of facilities involving ionizing radiation and nuclear technology in the country, including the 20 kW SLOWPOKE research reactor. Minister of Industry, Investment and Commerce, Audley Shaw stated that Jamaica could now "confidently forge ahead with engaging nuclear science and technology in all aspects of national development and wealth creation strategies".

Jamaica has a moderate ranking on the Global Innovation Index. In 2020, tt was ranked 72nd among the 131 featured economies. In 2021, it was ranked 9th among the 18 economies in Latin America and the Caribbean and 74th out of 132 countries overall. The report highlights E-participation and Government's online service as an area of weakness to greater innovation. Broadband penetration in Jamaica stood at 77.7% in March 2021. Via the National Broadband Initiative, the Jamaican government seeks to provide Internet connection to every household by 2025.

Scientific publications 
Caricom scientists have a modest output in terms of scientific research papers. UNESCO reports that between 2011 and 2019, output has fluctuated for most member states. Between 2017 and 2019, Caricom researchers continued to publish mostly in areas related to health sciences with Jamaica contributing over 20% of articles in this field. In terms of research density, Jamaica produced 114 publications per million inhabitants in 2019. Between 2014 and 2016, Jamaica ranked 4th in terms of average of relative citations (1.36). In terms of scientific co-authorship, between 2017 and 2019, Jamaica produced 379 publications in collaboration with the US, 118 with UK, 95 with Canada, 52 with France and 51 with Mexico.

Science activities 
Notable activities that are geared towards promoting science and innovation:

The Coding in Schools Programme: Launched in 2021, the aim is promote the teaching and learning of coding in public educational institutions across Jamaica.

STEM Ambassador Programme: Launched in early 2021, the programme allows industry experts to encourage STEM students to achieve academic and career goals through consistent mentorship and interactive support.

The Science Resource Centre & Innovation Laboratory: Opened in 2018, the lab is focused on the nurturing and development of revenue-generating clean technology companies within the region. It's the first facility of its kind within the Caribbean.

The Public Wi-Fi Hotspot Programme: Jamaica has thirteen Wi-Fi-hotspots (as of September 2021), providing free public access to Internet services. Seven new locations are planned by March 2022.

Science and Technology Fairs.

Institutions 
There are several institutions involved in undertaking research:
The Medical Association of Jamaica, whose origins date back to 1877, provides a wide range of services including medical education seminars and workshops.
The Institute of Jamaica, founded in 1879 "For the Encouragement of Literature, Science and Art in Jamaica".
The Jamaica Institution of Engineers, founded in the 1940s to promote and encourage the general advancement of engineering.
The University of the West Indies, founded in 1948, has faculties of medical sciences and natural sciences.
 The Geological Society of Jamaica, established in 1955, seeks to provide for the professional growth of earth scientists at all levels of expertise and from all sectors
The University of Technology, founded as the Jamaica Institute of Technology in 1958.
 The Scientific Research Council, located in Kingston and founded in 1960, coordinates scientific research efforts in Jamaica.
Sugar Industry Research Institute, founded in 1973, aims to research and develop methods to improve agriculture technology as it relates to sugar cane production.
The Caribbean Agricultural Research and Development Institute, founded in 1975, carries out research and development for agriculture in the Caribbean region.

Achievements 

In 2021, two Jamaican scientists won the prestigious International Network for Government Science Advice (INGSA) 2020 awards, making Jamaica the first country to take home prizes in the organisation's two award categories in any one year.

Jamaica has produced many internationally awarded scientists. Examples include:

 Henry Lowe, honoured by the United States Government for his contributions to the sciences, science education and exemplary public service. Lowe was presented with a proclamation from the United States House of Representatives.
 Thomas Lecky, made an honorary Officer of the Most Excellent Order of the British Empire for meritorious and devoted service to agriculture.
 Patricia DeLeon, awarded the Presidential Award for Excellence in Science, Mathematics, and Engineering Mentoring by Barack Obama.
 Geoff Palmer, Knighted by Queen Elizabeth ll for his services to human rights, science and charity. Palmer also became the fourth person to be honoured with the American Society of Brewing Chemists Award of Distinction.
 Evan Dale Abel,  named by Cell Press as one of the most inspirational Black scientists in the United States.
 Cicely Delphine Williams, made a Companion of the Order of St. Michael and St. George, awarded the James Spence Gold Medal of the Royal College of Paediatrics and Child Health for the discovery of Kwashiorkor. She was awarded an honorary Doctorate of Science from the University of Ghana, for her "love, care and devotion to sick children".
 Manley West, received the Certificate of Merit from the Government of Canada.
 Maydianne Andrade, named one of the Brilliant 10 by Popular Science magazine.
 Simone Anne Marie Badal-McCreath, awarded the Elsevier Foundation Award for Early Career Scientists in the Developing World for her creation of a lab at the Natural Products Institute to research the anti-cancer properties of natural Jamaican products.
 Patricia Daley, announced as one of the United Kingdom's 100 most influential people of African or African Caribbean heritage, in recognition of her contribution to education.
 Karen E. Nelson, received the Helmholtz International Fellow Award.
Walt W. Braithwaite, the Walt E. Braithwaite Legacy Award is named in his honour.
Bertram Fraser-Reid received numerous awards worldwide. These include the 1977 Merck, Sharp & Dohme Award from the Chemical Institute of Canada; the Claude S. Hudson Award in carbohydrate chemistry from the American Chemical Society in 1989; recognition as the Senior Distinguished U.S. Scientist by Germany’s Alexander von Humboldt Foundation in 1990; the Percy Julian Award from the National Organization of Black Chemists and Chemical Engineers in 1991; North Carolina Chemist of the Year by the American Institute of Chemistry in 1995 and the Haworth Memorial Medal and Lectureship from the Royal Society of Chemistry in 1995.

Notable scientific and technological contributions

Medicine                                                                                                                                   
 Discovery of the antibiotic Monamycin, by Kenneth E. Magnus in 1959.
Discovery of the child malnutrition syndrome, kwashiorkor, by Cicely Williams. She was the first to recognise and conduct research on kwashiorkor and differentiate it from other dietary deficiencies. Williams also developed a treatment regime to combat the disease – this saved many lives.
The pioneer of treatments for paediatric sickle cell anaemia, by Yvette Francis-McBarnette. She was the first to use prophylactic antibiotics in the treatment of children with sickle cell.
 Canasol, a medicated eye-drop for the treatment of glaucoma, created by West and Lockhart. Canasol reduces late stage glaucoma fluid eye pressure and is still one of the most popular drugs for treating glaucoma.
 The JaipurKnee, a budget-friendly prosthetic knee joint, co-created by Joel Sadler. The knee was listed at number 18 in Time Magazine's “50 Best Inventions of 2009”. The JaipurKnee is made of self-lubricating, oil-filled nylon and is both flexible and stable, even on irregular terrain. It was further developed by Stanford University in collaboration with the Jaipur Foot Group, a charity that provides prostheses to Indian amputees. The JaipurKnee has since been exported to many countries, impacting the lives of amputees around the world.
The (Ramphal) Cardiac Surgery Simulator, invented by Dr Paul Ramphal and Dr Daniel Coore. The model is used in the training of many cardiothoracic surgery residents in the United States

Space exploration                           
Co-invention of the world's first portable 3D non-destructive evaluation (NDE) system, by Robert Rashford. The NDE system detects flaws in materials used to construct aircraft, spacecraft and industrial pipelines without having to take these materials apart. The system was used in the maintenance of the United States Government's Hubble Space Telescope.
Invention of a protective enclosure for use transporting orbital replacement units (orus) within a space craft, by Robert Rashford.
Robert Rashford also designed and developed unique spacecraft support systems for the Upper Atmosphere Research Satellite (UARS) Airborne Support Equipment (UASE) at the Orbital Sciences Corporation (OSC). At General Electric, he designed and tested a variety of spacecraft for both commercial and military applications. At Bechtel Corporation, he designed a nuclear reactor support structure. He has designed numerous highly complex engineering systems that successfully flew on board NASA's Manned Space Flight Programs.

Astronomy and astrophysics   

 Mercedes Richards was a pioneer in the fields of computational astrophysics, stellar astrophysics, exoplanets and the physical dynamics of interacting binary star systems.

 Richards was the first astronomer to make images of the gravitational flow of gas between the stars in any interacting binary.
 She was the first to image the chromospheres and accretion disks in Algol binaries.
 She was the first in astronomy to apply the technique of tomography.
 She was the first astrophysicist to make theoretical hydrodynamic simulations of the Algol binary stars.
 She was the first astronomer to discover starspots on the cool star in an Algol binary.
 She was the first astrophysicist to apply novel distance correlation statistical methods to large astronomical databases.

Aviation/computer science 

 Invention of the Lingo programming language used in Adobe Director, by John Henry Thompson. The language is used for animation, web design, graphics, sound and video games.
Co-invention of methods and apparatus for managing mobile content, by John Henry Thompson.

 Walt W. Braithwaite helped transform the field of aerospace design. Prior to the 1970s, the aerospace industry developed new airplane models using manual drafting techniques. Braithwaite led the development of computer-aided design/computer-aided manufacturing (CAD/CAM) systems for Boeing. Airplane models could now be designed and manufactured digitally.
Braithwaite also played a critical part in developing the Initial Graphics Exchange Specification (IGES). As the lead engineer responsible for technical direction in developing an information network to integrate computer-aided design and computer-aided manufacturing, he led development of Boeing's common data format and translators. These were subsequently used as the basis for developing the IGES protocol.

Chemistry 

 Development of the "armed-disarmed" principle in glycosylation chemistry, by Bertram Fraser-Reid. 
Construction of the largest ever synthetic hetero-oligosaccharide without the use of automated methods, by Bertram Fraser-Reid.
Isolation of dibenzyl trisulphide (DTS) from the guinea hen weed and identification of anti-proliferation and/or cytotoxic activity on a wide range of cancer cell lines, by Williams and Levy.
Identification of DTS derivatives (e.g. DTS-albumin complexes) for providing anti-proliferation and/or cytotoxic activity on a wide range of cancer cell lines, by Williams and Levy. 
 Development of methods of isolating and/or providing DTS and/or its derivatives in an effective amount for providing an anti-proliferation and/or cytotoxic activity on cancer cell lines, by Williams and Levy.

Isolation of chemical compounds from the ball moss plant and identification of anti-cancer activity, by Henry Lowe. Developed into Alpha Prostate, a supplement used in the management of prostate health.
Isolation of eryngial from eryngium foetidum and Identification as an anti-threadworm agent, by Reese, Robinson and Forbes.

Industrial processes 

 Invention of the Barley Abrasion Process, by Sir Geoff Palmer. A patented technique that speeds up the production of malt from grain and which is used by the British brewing industry.
Sir Geoff Palmer was also the first person to utilise the scanning electron microscope to study malt production in detail.
Development of a commercial process to extract quassinoids from Bitterwood, by Yee and Jacobs.

Agricultural science                                                               
 Creation of disease resistant papaya, by Dr Paula Tennant. She manipulated the genetic make-up of the local papaya and created a new bioengineered variety that was resistant to papaya ringspot Virus (PRSV). This variant was named Jamaica Solo Sunrise and helped fortify the papaya sector.
Creation of new cattle breeds suited to tropical climates and terrain, by Thomas Lecky. He successfully created a new breed of dairy cattle –‘Jamaica Hope’ which is a combination of the British Jersey (a small, light-feeding cow), the Holstein (a heavy milk producer cow) and the Indian Sahiwal. The Jamaica Hope has a high heat tolerance, high resistance to ticks and tick-borne diseases and can produce much milk, even in the poor pasture land typical of tropical climates. It is extensively exported to other countries in the Caribbean, as well as Latin America. Dr. Lecky followed his Jamaica Hope success with the creation of two other cattle breeds – Jamaica Red and Jamaica Black. Lecky's work impacted on the development of cattle in many tropical countries.
Discovery of a new and distinct variety of the Zingiberaceae family, by Errol McGhie. This has been developed into a nutraceutical.
Creation of the Ortanique, a citrus fruit hybrid of the mandarin orange and the tangerine. In 1939, Dr Phillips was recognised by the Jamaica Agricultural Society (JAS) as the creator. The fruit is exported to many countries including Panama, London, New Zealand and Australia.

Mathematics 

 Creation of a mathematical cost capability trade-off model for HMS Queen Elizabeth, by Nira Chamberlain (who is predominately of Jamaican heritage).
 Invention of a long multiplication method, used in some UK schools, by Nira Chamberlain.

Technology 

 Patented Compact Design H2 Energy Storage and Generation system.
 Patented magnetic gearbox system.

Miscellaneous 
Discovery of previously unknown historical human migration patterns, by Neil Hanchard and his team. They also identified more than 3 million genetic variants that had not been previously observed which could contribute to making genetic tests more accurate for people with African ancestry.
Co-development of a new type of polyhexahydrotriazine (PHT). For his contribution, Gavin Jones became the first Jamaican named among Foreign Policy magazine's FP Top 100 Global Thinkers.

 The first comprehensive human microbiome study, by Karen Nelson and team.
 Identified the link between adipose tissue glucose transporter (GLUT4) and insulin resistance, by Evan Dale Abel and Barbara Kahn.

See also 

 List of Jamaicans - Science and medicine
List of Jamaican inventions and discoveries

References

External links
National Commission on Science and Technology